The New Mexico Livestock Board is a state-level government agency regulates livestock health and livestock identification in New Mexico.

History 
The board was created in 1967 by the merger of the New Mexico Cattle Sanitary Board and the New Mexico Sheep Sanitary Board.

Responsibilities 
The New Mexico Livestock Board maintains regulatory control over livestock now includes cattle, horses, mules, donkeys (burros), goats, sheep, pigs, bison, poultry, ratites (notably ostriches), camelids (notably llamas) and farmed deer. The regulatory authority does not include farmed fish, nor dogs or cats.

Every three years, the Board publishes a Brand Book, which serves as the basis for livestock identification in New Mexico.

Livestock health 
The New Mexico Livestock Board maintains health programs in:
Bovine Brucellosis
Bovine Trichimoniasis
Bovine Tuberculosis
Bovine Johne's Disease
Equine Infections Anemia (EIA)

Scrapie
Swine Health Surveillance

See also
 Kleppe v. New Mexico

References

External links
 "New Mexico Livestock Board" official website

Livestock Board, New Mexico
Veterinary organizations
Government agencies established in 1967
1967 establishments in New Mexico
Animal law
Veterinary medicine in the United States